The Haiti women's national under-20 football team represents Haiti in international football for women at this age level and is controlled by the Fédération Haïtienne de Football (FHF).

Competitive record

FIFA U-20 Women's World Cup

World Cups 
The team participated in the 2016 FIFA U-20 Women's World Cup qualification in Honduras. The roster included Nérilia Mondésir and Batcheba Louis. Their first game of group play saw them defeat Panama 3–2.

The team participated in qualifying for the 2018 FIFA U-20 Women's World Cup on the regional level, with Haiti serving as host for the first round of group play. Most of the players on the squad for qualification were drawn from the u-20 team. They defeated Cuba 3–1 in one of their games in continental qualification.  The team for the match included  Liliane Perez, who scored her team's first goal in the 11th minute  The roster also included Liaumeris Hernandez and Sherly Jeudy. Jeudy came off the bench, replacing Hernandez  to score Haiti's second goal of the game. Mondésir scored the team's third goal. The victory left the Haitians at the top of their group at the end of group play. An earlier match in group play saw them defeat Dominica 7 – 0, with Jeudy, Mondésir, Roseline Éloissaint and Melchie Dumornay all contributing goals.  They opened group play against Anguilla.

Roster 
Roster who competed at the 2018 CONCACAF Women's U-20 Championship and for the first time in history, qualified for the 2018 FIFA U-20 Women's World Cup.

Matches

See also

Haiti women's national football team
Haiti women's national under-17 football team

References

u20
Women's football in Haiti
North American women's national under-20 association football teams
Caribbean national under-20 association football teams